Ingalill is a Nordic feminine given name. Notable people with the name include:

Ingalill Mosander (born 1943), Swedish journalist
Ingalill Olsen (born 1955), Norwegian politician 

Scandinavian feminine given names